"When I've Learned" (also known as "When I've Learned (Enough to Die)") is a song written by Buddy Killen, Ray Baker and Delbert Wilson. and released in 1958 as a single (Columbia 4-41288) by Bobby Lord.

Later, the song was notably recorded by Johnny Cash.

Cash's version was released as a single by Columbia Records (Columbia 4-42301, with "The Big Battle" on the opposite side) in January, February, or March 1962.

Composition 
John M. Alexander in his book The Man in Song: A Discographic Biography of Johnny Cash calls the songs "one of Johnny's best performances on the album ["Hymns from the Heart"], and one of his finest gospel recordings."

References 

Bobby Lord songs
Johnny Cash songs
1958 singles
1962 singles
Songs written by Buddy Killen
Columbia Records singles
1958 songs